Esporte Clube Primeiro Passo Vitória da Conquista, commonly referred to as Vitória da Conquista, is a Brazilian football club based in Vitória da Conquista, Bahia. The club plays in Série D, the fourth tier of Brazilian football, as well as in the Campeonato Baiano, the top level of the Bahia state football league.

They competed in the Série C in 2008, and in the Série D in 2011, 2012, 2013 and 2014.

History
The club was founded on January 21, 2005. They won the Campeonato Baiano Second Level in 2006 and the Copa Governador do Estado da Bahia in 2010. Vitória da Conquista competed in the Série C in 2008, when they were eliminated in the Second Stage, and competed in the Série D in 2011, 2012, 2013 and 2014, in all occasions, being eliminated in the first stage. They won the Copa Governador do Estado da Bahia again in 2011, when they beat Atlético de Alagoinhas in the final, the same team they beat in the previous season. Vitória won the Copa Governador do Estado da Bahia again in 2012, when they beat Jacuipense in the final.

Achievements
Copa Governador do Estado da Bahia:
 Winners (5): 2010, 2011, 2012, 2014, 2016
Campeonato Baiano Second Level:
 Winners (1): 2006
Campeonato Baiano:
 Runner-up: 2015
 Third place: 2008, 2014

Season records

References: rsssfbrasil

Stadium
Esporte Clube Primeiro Passo Vitória da Conquista play their home games at Lomanto Júnior. The stadium has a maximum capacity of 12,500 people.

References

Association football clubs established in 2005
Football clubs in Bahia
2005 establishments in Brazil